Jim Zubkavich, known professionally as Jim Zub, is a Canadian comic book writer, artist, and art instructor best known for creating comics Skullkickers (2010), Wayward (2014), and Glitterbomb (2016)  for Image Comics, and writing on the series Thunderbolts (2016), Uncanny Avengers (2017), Avengers: No Surrender (2018), and Champions (2018) for Marvel Comics. As well as writing and creating comics, Zub is the former program co-ordinator and a current art professor at Toronto's Seneca College. He lives in Toronto, Canada with his wife, Stacy King.

Early life 
Jim Zub is Canadian. He grew up watching Spider-Man cartoons as a kid, and soon after fell in love with comics. He has stated that Stan Lee was a big influence on him, specifically by giving his superheroes flaws.

Career 
Jim Zub created his first comic, Makeshift Miracle, in 2001, followed by a nine-year stint at UDON Entertainment as a colorist, illustrator, project manager, writer and editor where he wrote various Street Fighter comic books.

In 2010, Zub launched Skullkickers at Image Comics. A creator-owned sword & sorcery action-comedy, Skullkickers ran for thirty-three issues completing six volumes. The series came to an end in 2015.

In 2013, Zub wrote Samurai Jack comics for IDW and Cartoon Network. Initially intended as one five-issue arc, the comic ran twenty issues, ending in 2015.

In 2014, Zub launched Wayward at Image Comics with art by co-creator Steven Cummings. His first creator-owned book since Skullkickers, Wayward is described as Buffy The Vampire Slayer set in Japan." A teen coming-of-age story injected with Japanese myth and the supernatural. The series spanned 30 issues and six trade paperback volumes before coming to an end on October 31, 2018.

Zub and IDW partnered up for Dungeons & Dragons: Legends of Baldur’s Gate #1-5 in 2014, followed up by Dungeons & Dragons: Shadows of the Vampire #1-5 in 2016, Dungeons & Dragons: Frost Giant’s Fury #1-5 in 2017, and Dungeons & Dragons: Evil At Baldur’s Gate #1-5 in 2018.

In 2016, Zub and French-Canadian artist Djibril Morissette-Phan launched Glitterbomb at Image Comics, a four-part mini-series about a struggling actress trying to regain fame in a sexist, abusive industry. A second four-part mini-series, Glitterbomb: The Fame Game, launched in 2017.

Zub started writing for Marvel in 2016 with Thunderbolts, followed by Uncanny Avengers in 2017. He created a new hero, villains, and new backstories in the 16-part Avengers: No Surrender in 2018, as well as taking over Champions with #19, and creating a new Canadian Hero, Snowguard. Also in 2018, Zub wrote the four-part Wolverine miniseries, Mystery in Madripoor.

In August of 2018, Zub teamed up with writer Patrick Rothfuss and artist Troy Little to write a Dungeons & Dragons/Rick & Morty crossover mini-series, titled Rick and Morty vs. Dungeons & Dragons #1-4. Zub co-wrote, with Sarah Stern and with art by Little, Rick and Morty vs. Dungeons & Dragons: Chapter II: Painscape; the follow-up series was published from September to December 2019. The Rick and Morty vs Dungeons and Dragons Deluxe Edition, by Rothfuss, Zub, and Little, was nominated for the 2022 "Best Graphic Album—Reprint" Eisner Award.

In late 2018, it was announced that Zub, along with writers Mark Waid and Al Ewing, would reunite for Avengers: No Road Home, being called a "spiritual successor" to their previous collaboration, Avengers: No Surrender." Art will be done by Paco Medina and Sean Izaakse. The series began in February 2019.

Personal life 
Zub and his wife, Stacy King live in Toronto. Stacy King was a marketing manager at UDON Entertainment as of 2015. And as well as writing comics, Zub is also a professor at Toronto's Seneca College and teaches classes in layout and design, character animation and animation history.

Awards and nominations

Bibliography

IDW
Samurai Jack #1-20 collected as:
 Volume 1 (collects #1-4, TPB, 120 pages, 2014)
 Volume 2 (collects #5-10, TPB, 120 pages, 2014)
 Volume 3 (collects #11-15, TPB, 120 pages, 2015)
 Volume 4 (collects #16-20, TPB, 120 pages, 2015)
Dungeons & Dragons: Legends of Baldur’s Gate #1-5 collected as:
 Volume 1 (collects #1-4, TPB, 124 pages, 2015)
Dungeons & Dragons: Shadows of the Vampire #1-5 collected as:
 Volume 1 (collects #1-4, TPB, 120 pages, 2016)
Dungeons & Dragons: Frost Giant’s Fury #1-5 collected as:
 Volume 1 (collects #1-4, TPB, 128 pages, 2017)
Dungeons & Dragons: Evil At Baldur’s Gate #1-5 collected as:
 Volume 1 (collects #1-4, TPB, 120 pages, 2018)
Rick and Morty vs. Dungeons & Dragons #1-4 collected as:
 Volume 1 (collects #1-4, TPB, 120 pages, 2019)

Image
Skullkickers #1-34 collected as:
 Volume 1 (collects #1-5, TPB, 144 pages, 2011)
 Volume 2 (collects #6-11, TPB, 144 pages, 2011)
 Volume 3 (collects #12-17, TPB, 144 pages, 2012)
 Volume 4 (collects #18-23, TPB, 160 pages, 2013)
 Volume 5 (collects #24-29, TPB, 144 pages, 2014)
 Volume 6 (collects #30-33 & #100, TPB, 144 pages, 2015)
Wayward #1-30 collected as:
 Volume 1 (collects #1-5, TPB, 144 pages, 2015)
 Volume 2 (collects #6-10, TPB, 136 pages, 2015)
 Volume 3 (collects #11-15, TPB, 128 pages, 2016)
 Volume 4 (collects #16-20, TPB, 136 pages, 2017)
 Volume 5 (collects #21-25, TPB, 136 pages, 2018)
 Volume 6 (collects #26-30, TPB, 152 pages, 2018)
  Glitterbomb #1-4 collected as:
 Volume 1 (collects #1-4, TPB, 136 pages, 2017)
  Glitterbomb: The Fame Game #1-4 collected as:
 Volume 1 (collects #1-4, TPB, 120 pages, 2018)

Marvel
Thunderbolts (2016-2017) #1-12 collected as:
 Volume 1 (collects #1-6, TPB, 144 pages, 2017)
 Volume 2 (collects #7-12, TPB, 144 pages, 2017)
Uncanny Avengers #26-30 collected as:
 Volume 5 (collects #26-30, TPB, 112 pages, 2018)
Avengers #675-690 collected as:
 Avengers: No Surrender (collects #675-690, TPB, 352 pages, 2018)
Champions Vol. 2 (2016-2019) #19-27, Vol. 3 (2019) #1-10 collected as:
 Champions Volume 4: Northern Lights (collects #19-21 and Infinity Countdown: Champions #1-2, TPB, 112 pages, 2018)
 Champions Volume 5: Weird War One (collects #22-27, TPB, 176 pages, 2019)
 Champions by Jim Zub Volume 1: Beat the Devil (collects #1-5, TPB, 136 Pages, 2019)
 Champions by Jim Zub Volume 2: Give and Take (collects #7-10, TPB, 112 Pages, 2019)

References

External links 
 

Living people
Year of birth missing (living people)
Canadian comics creators
Image Comics
Marvel Comics writers
Marvel Comics people